Hoover's sign in pulmonology is one of two signs named for Charles Franklin Hoover.

It refers to inward movement of the lower rib cage during inspiration, - instead of outward as is normal - implying a flat, but functioning, diaphragm, often associated with COPD. COPD, and more specifically emphysema, often lead to hyperexpansion of the lungs due to air trapping.  The resulting flattened diaphragm contracts downwards on inspiration, thereby paradoxically pulling the inferior ribs inwards with its movement.

See also
Hoover's sign (leg paresis)

References

Physical examination